The 2002 Giro di Lombardia was the 96th edition of the Giro di Lombardia cycle race and was held on 19 October 2002. The race started in Cantù and finished in Bergamo. The race was won by Michele Bartoli of the Fassa Bortolo team.

General classification

References

2002
Giro di Lombardia
Giro di Lombardia
Giro Di Lombardia
October 2002 sports events in Europe